The Women's rhythmic individual clubs gymnastics competition at the 2022 Commonwealth Games in Birmingham, England was held on 6 August 2022 at the Arena Birmingham.

Schedule
The schedule was as follows:

All times are British Summer Time (UTC+1)

Results

Qualification

Qualification for this apparatus final was determined within the team final.

Final
The results are as follows:

References

Women's rhythmic individual clubs